The Southwestern Proving Ground Building No. 4 is a gun shelter and stockade at 259 Hempstead County Road 279 in Oakhaven, Arkansas, northwest of the city of Hope.  It is located on property that was once part of the Southwestern Proving Ground, a major military facility during World War II whose largest portion was transformed into Hope Municipal Airport.  Building No. 4 is a roofless concrete structure with seven bays open to the southeast, with smaller openings on the northwest side.  It was built in 1941 to replicate typical stockaded gun placements in field conditions, its two-foot-thick walls designed to isolate gun crews from the dangers of fire and exploding ammunition.  The building is now used by a private owner for storage and agricultural purposes.

The building was listed on the National Register of Historic Places in 2009.

See also
Southwestern Proving Ground Building No. 5, located on the same property
Southwestern Proving Ground Building No. 129, located on the same property
Southwestern Proving Ground Officers Quarters Historic District
National Register of Historic Places listings in Hempstead County, Arkansas

References

Military facilities on the National Register of Historic Places in Arkansas
Military installations established in 1941
Buildings and structures in Hempstead County, Arkansas
National Register of Historic Places in Hempstead County, Arkansas
1941 establishments in Arkansas